Nils Lauper (born  in Seedorf) is a Swiss freestyle skier, specializing in halfpipe.

Lauper competed at the 2014 Winter Olympics for Switzerland. He placed 16th in the qualifying round in the halfpipe, failing to advance.

As of April 2014, his best showing at the World Championships is 10th, in the 2011 halfpipe.

Lauper made his World Cup debut in November 2003. As of April 2014, he has three World Cup podium finishes, with his best a silver at Les Contamines in 2008–09. His best World Cup overall finish in the halfpipe is 3rd, in 2008–09.

World Cup Podiums

References

1982 births
Living people
Olympic freestyle skiers of Switzerland
Freestyle skiers at the 2014 Winter Olympics
People from Seeland District
Swiss male freestyle skiers
Sportspeople from the canton of Bern
21st-century Swiss people